The Chicago Athletic Association was an American football team, based in Chicago, Illinois. The club itself had been organized in 1890, and in 1892 it formed a football team. The team was built around veterans of Chicago's University Club football team.

History
The University Club football team was the initial first-rate team produced by the city, because Illinois and Northwestern were still years away from being competitive, and Amos Alonzo Stagg would not form the University of Chicago's program until 1892.

Chicago society therefore needed a team to represent the city in annual Thanksgiving Day games, and from 1888 to 1891 they created the University Club team and had it compete against either Michigan or Cornell each year. The University Club team was made up of recent college graduates, whose families were from Chicago but who were products of east coast football programs.

In 1892, the Chicago A. A. football team not only took over the primer football role of the University Club team. It built a program of playing a season-long schedule of university and club teams. That team included at least eight names from the 1891 University Club team, and added Yale halfback star Pudge Heffelfinger to the line-up. The 1893 team featured Heffelfinger, Yale, Laurie Bliss, and five players from the University Club.

In 1893 at the Chicago's World Fair, the Chicago A. A. played one of the first night football games against West Point (the earliest being on September 28, 1892, between Mansfield State Normal and Wyoming Seminary). Chicago won the game 14–0. The game lasted only 40 minutes, compared to the normal 90 minutes.

The exterior of the Chicago Athletic Association building (1893) is based on the Doge's Palace in Venice.

Notable players
In 1894, Jesse Van Doozer dropped out of Northwestern to play with the Chicago Athletic Association. Alvin Culver, who graduated that same year did the same. Knowlton Ames, a former All-American from Princeton, also played on the team in 1892. Sport Donnelly also played with the Chicago Athletic Association in 1892. In a game against the New York Cresants, the Cresants refused to take field unless Donnelly was barred from the Chicago lineup because of some alleged rough tactics he used the year before. Chicago benched Donnelly, and his absence resulted in a tie. Donnelly then became enraged and refused to rejoin the team in Chicago. Pudge Heffelfinger, who was also playing for Chicago, joined Donnelly in the walk-out. After this game he was once again recruited by the Allegheny Athletic Association, to play for them. A few weeks later, Donnelly and Heffelfinger were professional players with that team. However, by 1896, Donnelly was once again with Chicago as a coach.

References

Notes

Bibliography

A History of Football at Northwestern: The First Twenty Years: 1882–1902

1892 establishments in Illinois
History of Illinois
Defunct American football teams
Early professional American football teams in Illinois
American football teams in Chicago
Athletic Club football teams and seasons